Manuel Locatelli  (born 8 January 1998) is an Italian professional footballer who plays as a midfielder for  club Juventus, on loan from Sassuolo. He represents the Italy national team.

After coming through the club's youth system, Locatelli made his professional debut with AC Milan, helping them win the 2016 Supercoppa Italiana. He moved to Sassuolo in 2018, before joining Juventus in 2021.

Locatelli represented Italy internationally, participating in Italy's victorious UEFA Euro 2020 campaign.

Club career

Early career
Locatelli began his career with Atalanta, before moving to AC Milan at the age of 11 years. With the Rossoneri he progressed through each youth category, from Esordienti to Primavera. In March 2015, Locatelli signed his first professional contract with Milan, effective from 1 July 2015 until 30 June 2018.

AC Milan
Locatelli received his first ever call-up to Milan's senior team ahead of the away game against Udinese played on 22 September 2015; he, however, remained an unused substitute. Later that season, he was promoted into the first team by the then Milan head coach Siniša Mihajlović. He made his Serie A debut aged 18, on 21 April 2016, replacing Andrea Poli after 87 minutes in a 0−0 home draw against Carpi. On 14 May 2016 he made his debut as a starter, in the last league match of the season against Roma at the San Siro.

2016–17 season
He made his season debut in a 1–0 victory over Sampdoria appearing as a second-half substitute. On 2 October 2016, after coming on as a substitute for captain Riccardo Montolivo, Locatelli scored his first Serie A goal with his first ever shot, in a dramatic 4–3 win over Sassuolo. Beginning the season on the bench, Locatelli received his first start of the season on 16 October at Chievo, taking over the deep-lying playmaker role in midfield vacated by Montolivo, who suffered a long-term injury over the international break. On 22 October, Locatelli scored with his second ever Serie A shot on target, the only goal in a rival match against Juventus, a strike with the outside of his right foot that hit the underside of the crossbar, and rifled past keeper Gianluigi Buffon.

Following a series of excellent performances, Locatelli received and accepted the offer to extend his contract until 30 June 2020, with the rise in pay.

On 25 January 2017, Locatelli was sent off for the first time of his career after receiving two yellow cards in 2016–17 Coppa Italia Quarter Final match against Juventus.

2017–18 season
Locatelli began the season as a starter in the second leg of Milan's Europa League qualification match against CS U Craiova, playing a vital role in Milan's 2–0 win on 3 August 2017. However, Montolivo's eventual recovery combined with the arrival of Lucas Biglia and frequent changes of formation under Vincenzo Montella started to limit his playing time. In November 2017, Montella was dismissed and replaced by Gennaro Gattuso who also viewed Locatelli as more of a backup for either Biglia or Montolivo than a starting lineup player. He finished the season with only 15 starts (of which only 5 were in Serie A) and 18 sub-ins.

Sassuolo
In the summer of 2018, Milan loaned in Tiémoué Bakayoko and suggested that Locatelli joins one of the lower-ranking Serie A teams on loan, preferably without a buy-out option. Locatelli agreed to depart yet submitted a full transfer request, later citing a perceived lack of trust in him from the club as the main reason for his decision. On 13 August 2018, Locatelli transferred to Sassuolo on loan with an obligation to buy. In his debut season for the neroverdi he made 31 appearances and scored 3 goals (against Catania in Coppa Italia and Cagliari and Chievo Verona in Serie A).

Loan to Juventus
On 18 August 2021, Juventus announced the signing of Locatelli on an initial two-year loan, with Juventus holding an obligation to then purchase the player for €25 million payable over three years plus €12.5 million in potential add-ons. At Juventus, Locatelli reunited with Massimiliano Allegri, who had once been the head coach of Milan and called up Locatelli to train with the senior team in 2013 aged 15.

On 22 August, Locatelli debuted for Juventus in a 2–2 draw against Udinese, coming on as substitute in the 90th minute. On 26 September, Locatelli scored his first goal for Juventus, the winning goal of a 3–2 home win over Sampdoria. In the 86th minute of play, he scored the lone goal of a 1–0 win against Derby della Mole rivals Torino on 2 October.

International career

Youth
Locatelli was part of the Italy U17 team at the 2015 UEFA European Under-17 Championship. He also took part in the 2016 Under-19 Championship with the under-19 side, as Italy finished runners-up.

Locatelli made his debut with the Italy U21 team on 23 March 2017, in a friendly 2–1 win against Poland. In June 2017, he was included in the Italy under-21 squad for the 2017 UEFA European Under-21 Championship by manager Luigi Di Biagio. Italy were eliminated by Spain in the semi-finals on 27 June, following a 3–1 defeat.

Locatelli additionally took part in the 2019 UEFA European Under-21 Championship.

Senior
Locatelli made his debut with the senior Italy squad on 7 September 2020, playing as a starter in a 1–0 UEFA Nations League victory against the Netherlands in Amsterdam. On 28 March 2021, Locatelli scored his first goal for Italy, the second of a 2–0 away win over Bulgaria in a 2022 World Cup qualification match.

In June 2021, Locatelli was included in Italy's squad for UEFA Euro 2020 by manager Roberto Mancini. On 16 June, he scored two goals in Italy's second group stage match, a 3–0 win against Switzerland. Although he started in Italy's first two group games of the tournament, he was later relegated to the bench following the recovery of the injured Marco Verratti. On 6 July, in the semi-final of the competition against Spain, Locatelli came on as a substitute for Nicolò Barella late in the second half of regulation time; following a 1–1 draw after extra-time, he took Italy's first spot-kick in resulting shoot-out, which was saved by Unai Simón, although Italy ultimately advanced to the final 4–2 on penalties. On 11 July, Locatelli won the European Championship with Italy following a 3–2 penalty shoot-out victory over England at Wembley Stadium in the final, after a 1–1 draw in extra-time; Locatelli made a substitute appearance during the final, coming on for Verratti in the first half of extra-time.

Style of play
Locatelli is primarily deployed as a deep-lying midfielder, usually operating in an attacking role in front of the team's defence, in a position similar to that of his idol Andrea Pirlo, due to his ability to create chances or dictate the tempo of his team's play in midfield with his passing range. A versatile midfielder, he can also play in a box-to-box role, or as a mezzala in a 4–3–3 formation, although this is not his preferred position; he has occasionally even been used as an attacking midfielder, a position in which he was initially fielded in his youth, before being moved into a deeper midfield role.

While not particularly fast, he is an elegant and quick-thinking player, who possesses excellent vision, passing, ball control, technique, and dribbling skills, as well as a powerful and accurate shot from long range. His reading of the game, defensive work-rate, tactical intelligence, and ball-winning abilities are also optimal for a defensive midfielder. His playing style has been compared to that of Argentine midfielder Fernando Redondo, but with more of an offensive mindset, due to his ability to make late attacking runs off the ball from behind; he has also been likened to other playmakers such as Xavi, Zinedine Zidane, and Demetrio Albertini. Not long before Locatelli signed with Juventus, former long-term club player Alessio Tacchinardi compared him to himself and Antonio Conte, calling Locatelli a mix of both. Considered to be a promising young player, in 2015 The Guardian named him one of the 50 best young players in the world born in 1998.

Personal life
On 21 June 2022, he married Thessa Lachovic. On 16 October, his wife announced she had been pregnant.

Career statistics

Club

International

Scores and results list Italy's goal tally first, score column indicates score after each Locatelli goal

Honours
AC Milan
Supercoppa Italiana: 2016

Italy U19
UEFA European Under-19 Championship runner-up: 2016

Italy
UEFA European Championship: 2020
UEFA Nations League third place: 2020–21

Individual
Premio Bulgarelli Number 8: 2020

Orders
Knight of the Order of Merit of the Italian Republic: 2021

References

External links

Serie A Profile 
FIGC Profile 

1998 births
Living people
Sportspeople from Lecco
Italian footballers
Association football midfielders
A.C. Milan players
U.S. Sassuolo Calcio players
Juventus F.C. players
Serie A players
Italy youth international footballers
Italy under-21 international footballers
Italy international footballers
UEFA Euro 2020 players
UEFA European Championship-winning players
Knights of the Order of Merit of the Italian Republic
Footballers from Lombardy